John Busing (born September 1, 1983) is a former American football safety. He was signed by the Cincinnati Bengals as an undrafted free agent in 2006. He played college football at Miami University. Busing also played for the Houston Texans and the New York Giants.

College career
Busing came to Miami University as a wide receiver out of high school.  He was moved to linebacker where he led the nation in interceptions by a linebacker during his junior year.

Professional career

Cincinnati Bengals
Busing joined the Cincinnati Bengals as a free agent out of college and was moved to strong safety. After the 2008 season, he became a restricted free agent but was non-tendered and became an unrestricted free agent.

Houston Texans
Busing was signed by the Houston Texans on May 19, 2009. After the 2009 season, he became a restricted free agent but was non-tendered by the Texans and became an unrestricted free agent.

New York Giants
On July 31, 2010 Busing was signed by the New York Giants but was released just over a month later on September 4.

Personal life
Busing dated Andi Dorfman for four years.  Dorfman reportedly broke up with Busing right before Season 18 of "The Bachelor" began featuring Juan Pablo Galavis.

References

External links
Just Sports Stats

1983 births
Living people
Players of American football from Georgia (U.S. state)
American football safeties
Miami RedHawks football players
Cincinnati Bengals players
Houston Texans players
New York Giants players
Sacramento Mountain Lions players